Naib Subedar Monu Goyat is an Indian kabaddi player and an Indian Army Junior Commissioned Officer (JCO). He was part of the India national kabaddi team that won a bronze medal at the 2018 Asian Games. He will play for Patna Pirates again in the Pro Kabaddi League 2021 starting from 22 Dec.

Early life 
Born in Kungar village of Haryana's Bhiwani district, Goyat started playing kabaddi at age ten after he was influenced by his uncle Vijender Singh, a former kabaddi player. Singh gave him initial training. After joining the army in 2011, he was coached by Jasvir Singh. Representing Services Sports Control Board, he helped his side reach the final of the 65th Senior National Championships in 2017. A resident of Hansi, Haryana, Goyat made his debut for India at the 2018 Dubai Kabaddi Masters.

Kabaddi career

Pro Kabaddi League

Season 4
Goyat made his debut in Pro Kabaddi League playing for the Bengal Warriors. He scored 59 points in 13 games and was among the top 15 raiders in the league. He was one of the primary raiders for the Bengal Warriors.

Season 5
Goyat was bought by the Patna Pirates for the 2017 Pro Kabaddi League season and had a fruitful year with the team, scoring 191 raid points in 26 matches with an average of 7.34 points per match, finishing as the fourth highest scoring raider in the league. Of those 191 raid points, he scored 45 in do-or-die situations, making him the second most successful raider in this category.

Season 6
He captained the side in the absence of Surender Nada. Goyat scored 160 raid points in 20 matches with an average of 8 raid points per match.

International

He was part of the India national kabaddi team that won a bronze medal at the 2018 Asian Games.

References

Living people
Indian kabaddi players
1992 births
Kabaddi players at the 2018 Asian Games
Medalists at the 2018 Asian Games
Asian Games bronze medalists for India
Asian Games medalists in kabaddi
Pro Kabaddi League players
People from Bhiwani district